Cyclochila is a genus of cicada native to eastern Australia. Two species are recognised, the greengrocer (Cyclochila australasiae) and the northern greengrocer (C. virens).

Cyclochila is the only genus of the tribe Cyclochilini.

References

Hemiptera of Australia
Cicadinae
Cicadidae genera